Samuel Williams may refer to:

Politics
 Samuel Crowdson Williams (1812–1862), American politician, businessman, and soldier in Virginia
 Samuel L. Williams (1933–1994), president of the Los Angeles Board of Police Commissioners
 Samuel May Williams (1795–1858), American businessman and politician
 Samuel Williams (American politician) (1851–1913), American politician
 Samuel Williams (Australian politician) (1878–1962), New South Wales politician
 Samuel Williams (British politician) (1842–1926), British politician and Governor of Grenada

Religion
 Samuel Williams (minister) (1743-1817), American minister and educator
Samuel Williams (missionary) (1822–1907), New Zealand missionary, farmer, educationalist, and pastoralist
 Samuel Wells Williams (1812–1884), linguist, missionary and sinologist from the United States
 Samuel Woodrow Williams (1912–1970), African American Baptist minister, professor and civil rights activist

Other
 Samuel Williams (American author) (died 1881), American newspaper editor and author
 Samuel Williams (cyclist) (born 1994), English racing cyclist
 Samuel Williams (engraver) (1788–1853), English artist
 Samuel Cole Williams (1864–1947), Tennessee jurist, historian, educator, and businessman
 Samuel Tankersley Williams (1896–1984), United States Army Lieutenant General
 Samuel "Savoirfaire" Williams, American jazz violinist 
 Samuel Williams (1852–?), American slave narrative author with the pen name Sam Aleckson

See also
 Sam Williams (disambiguation)